Geri Çipi (born 28 February 1976) is an Albanian former professional footballer who played as a  centre-back. He most notably played 76 games for Gent

from 2000 to 2003, and was part of the Albania national team from 1995 to 2005. He was considered to be one of the europe best centre-backs in his prime due to his defensive consistency and awareness, as well as his strength, leadership, and ability in the air. After establishing himself at Flamurtari during the early 1990s, Geri moved to Maribor in the summer of 1998.

International career
Çipi made his debut for Albania in a November 1995 friendly match against Bosnia and Herzegovina and earned a total of 34 caps, scoring no goals. His final international was a June 2005 FIFA World Cup qualification match against Georgia.

Personal life
His uncle Kreshnik also played for Flamurtari and the national team.

International statistics

See also
NK Maribor players

References

External links

1976 births
Living people
Footballers from Vlorë
Albanian footballers
Association football central defenders
Albania international footballers
Flamurtari Vlorë players
NK Maribor players
Slovenian PrvaLiga players
Expatriate footballers in Slovenia
K.A.A. Gent players
Belgian Pro League players
Expatriate footballers in Belgium
Eintracht Frankfurt players
Rot-Weiß Oberhausen players
Bundesliga players
2. Bundesliga players
Expatriate footballers in Germany
KF Tirana players
Albanian expatriate footballers
Albanian expatriate sportspeople in Slovenia
Albanian expatriate sportspeople in Belgium
Albanian expatriate sportspeople in Germany